Brahim Bouhadan (born 2 February 1983) is a Dutch former professional footballer who played as a forward.

References

1983 births
Living people
Dutch footballers
AGOVV Apeldoorn players
Fortuna Sittard players
TOP Oss players
Eerste Divisie players
Association football forwards
Sportspeople from Roosendaal
Dutch sportspeople of Moroccan descent
Vierde Divisie players
Footballers from North Brabant